Chondroid lipomas are deep-seated, firm, yellow tumors that characteristically occur on the legs of women. They exhibit a characteristic genetic translocation t(11;16) with a resulting C11orf95-MKL2 fusion oncogene.

See also
Lipoma
Skin lesion
List of cutaneous conditions

References

External links 

Dermal and subcutaneous growths